Attiliosa caledonica is a species of sea snail, a marine gastropod mollusc in the family Muricidae, the murex snails or rock snails.

Description

Distribution
This marine species occurs off New Caledonia.

References

External links
 MNHN, Paris: lectotype
  Jousseaume, F. (1881). Diagnoses de mollusques nouveaux. Le Naturaliste. 3(44): 349–350

Gastropods described in 1881
Attiliosa